The Chengdu J-9 (Chinese: 歼-9) was an interceptor aircraft that was cancelled during development in the People's Republic of China (PRC). It was proposed in 1964 by the 601 Institute (Shenyang) as a higher-performing alternative to the Shenyang J-8. Development was disrupted by the Cultural Revolution and frequently changing requirements; in addition, development was transferred to the 611 Institute (Chengdu). The program was cancelled in 1980.

Development
By 1964, the Chengdu J-7 was inadequate to perform long-range, high-altitude interceptions. The Chinese Aeronautical Establishment held a conference on 25 October to discuss future fighters. The 601 Institute had two proposals; a twin-engined "scaled-up" J-7 which became the J-8, and a higher-performing single-engined option that became the J-9. The J-9 was technically riskier; it was not based on an existing design, and the required engine - an afterburning turbofan generating  dry and  reheat thrust - did not exist in China. Shenyang developed a delta and a double-delta concept in 1965.

Development was officially approved following a Ministry of Aerospace Industry (MAI) conference on 12-17 January 1966 with the goal of either an air superiority fighter or a pure interceptor. This was revised on April 1 with new requirements for endurance, rate of climb, and significantly increased range. A development schedule was approved on April 12. Shenyang responded first with the J-9A-IV (a tailed delta with lateral intakes) and then the J-9B-V (a tailless-delta); the former was unable to meet requirements. The Cultural Revolution paused development. Development on the J-9B-V resumed in 1968. The goal of flying a prototype by the 20th anniversary of the PRC in October 1969 could not be achieved due to major development problems. MAI shifted work back to the J-9A-IV. In addition, development was transferred to Chengdu because Shenyang was now fully occupied with the J-8. Wang Shounan became the new chief designer.

The Ministry of Defense issued new requirements on 9 June 1970 - and slightly revised in November - for even greater range, speed, and altitude. Chengdu abandoned the J-9A-IV, and reworked the J-9B-V into the J-9B-VI. The J-9B-VI was a canard-delta with lateral intakes; a single ventral intake was rejected. The intended engine, the Woshan WS-6 turbofan, encountered development problems; a reverse-engineered Khachaturov R29-300 turbojet, to be called the WS-15, was selected as a less powerful alternative.

The requirements were revised in February 1975, calling for more range and an armament of four PL-4 air-to-air missiles. In November the State Planning Commission approved funding for five prototypes, with the first flight to take place in late-1980 or early-1981. However, the program was ended in 1980.

Specifications (J-9B-VI)

See also

References

Citations

Bibliography

External links

Interview - J-9 Chief Designer Wang Nanshou (Chinese language)

1970s Chinese fighter aircraft
1975 in China
Canard aircraft
Cancelled military aircraft projects of China
J-9
Delta-wing aircraft
J-09, Chengdu